P. R. S. Venkatesan is an Indian politician and former Member of Parliament elected from Tamil Nadu. He was elected to the Lok Sabha from Cuddalore constituency as an Indian National Congress candidate in the 1984 and 1989 elections and as a Tamil Maanila Congress (Moopanar) candidate in 1996 election.

He also served as a Member of the Legislative Assembly of Tamil Nadu. He was elected to the Tamil Nadu legislative assembly as an Indian National Congress candidate from Cuddalore constituency in 1991 election.

References 

Indian National Congress politicians from Tamil Nadu
Living people
India MPs 1984–1989
India MPs 1989–1991
India MPs 1996–1997
Lok Sabha members from Tamil Nadu
Tamil Maanila Congress politicians
People from Cuddalore district
Year of birth missing (living people)
Tamil Nadu MLAs 1991–1996